Belfast Woodvale was a constituency of the Parliament of Northern Ireland.

Boundaries
Belfast Woodvale was a borough constituency comprising part of western Belfast. It was created in 1929, when the House of Commons (Method of Voting and Redistribution of Seats) Act (Northern Ireland) 1929 introduced first past the post elections throughout Northern Ireland.

Belfast Woodvale was created by the division of Belfast West into four new constituencies. It survived unchanged, returning one member of Parliament, until the Parliament of Northern Ireland was temporarily suspended in 1972, and then formally abolished in 1973.

Politics
The seat was strongly Unionist, but there was a strong local labour movement, and for much of its history, the seat was held by the Northern Ireland Labour Party or independent Unionists.

Members of Parliament

Election results

At the 1949 Northern Ireland general election, John William Nixon was elected unopposed.

References

Woodvale
Northern Ireland Parliament constituencies established in 1929
Northern Ireland Parliament constituencies disestablished in 1973